NX may refer to:

Arts and entertainment
 NX Files, an action adventure martial arts web-show
 Northern Exposure, a 1990s TV show turned cable

Science and technology

Computing
NX bit, a term for marking parts of computer memory as "no execute"
NX technology, a computer program that handles remote X Window System connections
Siemens NX, a CAx software product from Siemens PLM Software
DRS/NX, a port of UNIX System V for ICL DRS and later servers
EDIUS NX, a video editing and capture card sold by Grass Valley
NXDOMAIN, "nonexistent domain", an error response to a DNS query, sometimes used for DNS hijacking

Other uses in science and technology
 NX, the pre-release codename of the Nintendo Switch video game console
 Nox (unit) (nx), a unit of illuminance, equal to 1/1000 lux
 Samsung NX series, a series of digital cameras

Transport
 NX Bridge, over the Passaic River in New Jersey
 Lexus NX, a crossover vehicle
 Nissan NX, and Nissan Pulsar NX, a range of subcompact coupes offered by Nissan from the 1980s to 1993
 Air Macau (IATA: NX)
 A 1967-1968 super-express line; see N (New York City Subway service)

Other uses
 Net exports, in economics
 Ningxia, an autonomous region in China (Guobiao abbreviation NX)

See also